Certhioidea is a superfamily belonging to the infraorder Passerida containing wrens and their allies.  It was proposed in 2004 by Cracraft and colleagues to house a clade of four families that were removed from the superfamily Sylvioidea.

Classification 
In 2019 Carl Oliveros and colleagues published a large molecular phylogenetic study of the passerines that included species from each of the five families that make up the superfamily Certhioidea. The spotted creepers (genus Salpornis) are here included in the family Certhiidae. Edward Dickinson and Leslie Christidis in the fourth edition of the Howard and Moore Complete Checklist of the Birds of the World placed them in their own family Salpornithidae.

References 

 
Bird superfamilies
Passerida
Extant Oligocene first appearances